Ben Henderson may refer to:

Ben Henderson (baseball), American baseball player
Ben Henderson (politician) (born 1957), Canadian politician and member of Edmonton City Council
Benson Henderson (born 1983), mixed martial artist
Jaribu Shahid (born 1955), American jazz musician born Ben Henderson